In Japan, the  is the highest ranking executive of a prefecture.

The governor is directly elected for a four-year term. Governors are subject to recall referendums. In each prefecture, between one and four vice governors are appointed by the governor with the approval of the prefectural assembly. In the case of death, disability, or resignation of the governor, one of the vice governors becomes either governor or acting governor.

Candidates must be Japanese citizens and at least 30 years old.

See also
List of current governors
List of governors by prefectures

References

Government of Japan